Fury: Original Motion Picture Soundtrack is the original soundtrack of the 2014 film Fury, composed by Steven Price.

Track listing

Development 
On November 19, 2013 composer Steven Price signed on to score the film. Varèse Sarabande revealed the details of the soundtrack album of the film on September 16, and released the original soundtrack album for the film on October 14, 2014.

References 

War film soundtracks
2014 soundtrack albums
Varèse Sarabande soundtracks